Snail Shell Cave is a limestone cave in Rockvale, Tennessee. Snail Shell Cave lies on an  preserve near Murfreesboro, Tennessee. Snail Shell cave is owned by the Southeastern Cave Conservancy, which has called it "one of the most biologically significant cave sites in the southeastern United States."

The mouth of Snail Shell Cave is a sinkhole, with nearly vertical walls, 125 feet in diameter and 60 feet deep.  The cave stream flows across the bottom and may be followed upstream or downstream.  The entrance to Snail Shell Cave was known to local residents, but deep water prevented serious exploration.  Tom Barr and Bert Denton located the entrance in September 1951 and became the first modern cave explorers in the cave.  "

Anyone wishing to visit Snail Shell Cave must have permission from the Southeastern Cave Conservancy, Inc. to enter the cave.  At least one member of any group entering the cave is required to be either an SCCi or an NSS (National Speleological Society) member.  Due to the deep water and flooding conditions encountered in this cave, this cave must be considered extremely dangerous and should not, under any circumstances, be entered by anyone who is not a highly skilled cave explorer.  Several people have already died in this cave.

For the most complete information available on Snail Shell Cave and the other caves that compose the Snail Shell Cave System, you may wish to consult the book "Snail Shell Cave" (August, 2012) by Larry E. Matthews and Bob Biddix.  Published by the National Speleological Society, this book is 241 pages long and contains numerous maps and photographs of the caves.  ("Snail Shell Cave")

References

Further reading
 Thomas C. Barr, Jr. (1961), Caves of Tennessee, Bulletin 61 of the Tennessee Division of Geology.  Description, maps, and photographs of Snail Shell Cave are on pages 407-412.
 Larry E. Matthews and Bob Biddix (August, 2012), Snail Shell Cave, Published by the National Speleological Society, 241 pages, .  A complete history of the cave with numerous maps and photographs.

External links
 Snail Shell Cave Management Plan, Southeastern Cave Conservancy, Inc., Approved 26 January 2002, Revised November 10, 2007

Caves of Tennessee
Protected areas of Rutherford County, Tennessee
Nature reserves in Tennessee
Landforms of Rutherford County, Tennessee